The International School Connection (ISC) is a non-profit education organization based in Tampa, Florida of the United States of America. It has an international Board of Directors, Officers, and Regional Hub coordinators that represent 15 countries on four continents. Over the last decade, the ISC has evolved from regional partnerships to a multi-national university cooperative, and an independent non-governmental agency.  Member schools come from Russia, Finland, Sweden, Norway, Spain, Germany, Canada, USA, Colombia, Venezuela, Malaysia, China, and Singapore.  Exploratory conversations are underway with educators in Brazil, Netherlands Antilles, Mexico, and New Zealand.

History
The ISC began its early formation in 1994 during a conference in Berlin.  Educators from Sweden, Russia, Finland, the Netherlands and the USA met to explore ways to create international school connections.  A conference was held in Sochi, Russia the following year, under the guidance of Conny Bjorkman (Sweden) and Ivan Prodanov and Irina Badayan (Russia).  Many cross border school connections were made in the following years.  Eventually Karolyn Snyder and Conny Bjorkman assumed leadership roles in developing a system of connections through the University of South Florida and Mid Sweden University.

In 1997, leaders from seven universities in seven countries signed an agreement, in Stockholm, to develop the International School Connection as a support system for schools and their leaders.  In 2000 a three-year pilot project was launched with graduate programs and a professional development program being offered in a web-based environment.  In 2003, near the completion of the pilot, the ISC became a non-profit organization in the USA, with an international Board of Directors and Officers.

Current Board of Directors
 John Fitzgerald
 Victor Pinedo, Jr. 
 Xinmin Sang
 Hans-Erik Persson
 Paul Senft, Jr. 
 Robert H. Anderson
 Dan Hector
 Kristen M. Snyder
 Joyce Burick Swarzman 
 Kai Sung
 Elaine Sullivan
 Karolyn J. Snyder

ISC Vision
For school and college leaders and faculty members to become global educators who prepare all students during their education years for a successful life as a global citizen.

Notable Member Schools
 A. Y. Jackson Secondary School
 Beijing 101 Middle School
 High School Affiliated to Nanjing Normal University

External links
 International School Connection Homepage
 The Katrineholm teachers’ visit to Ottawa Canada: Promoting International School Connections
 Pasco County Schools
 Youth Vision 5000, a program ICS helped to create in Curaçao
 The 2006 ISC Annual Global Summit

References

Educational organizations based in the United States